Sinowatsonia hoenei is a moth in the family Erebidae. It was described by Franz Daniel in 1943. It is found in Yunnan and Tibet in China.

Subspecies
Sinowatsonia hoenei hoenei (China: Yunnan)
Sinowatsonia hoenei alpicola (Daniel, 1943) (China: Yunnan, Tibet)

References

Moths described in 1943
Spilosomina